Hanjan is a village in Barzrud Rural District, in the Central District of Natanz County, Isfahan Province, Iran. At the 2006 census, its population was 234, in 110 families.

References 

Populated places in Natanz County